Ryan Wayne Wheeler (born July 10, 1988) is an American former professional baseball third baseman. He has played in Major League Baseball (MLB) for the Arizona Diamondbacks and Colorado Rockies.

Career

Amateur
Wheeler attended Loyola Marymount University in Los Angeles, California. In 2008, he played collegiate summer baseball with the Brewster Whitecaps of the Cape Cod Baseball League and was named a league all-star.

Arizona Diamondbacks
The Arizona Diamondbacks drafted Wheeler in the fifth round of the 2009 MLB Draft. MLB.com rated Wheeler the 18th best prospect in the Diamondbacks' organization heading into the 2012 season. Wheeler was named the PCL's Offensive Player of the Week for the week ending April 29.

On July 20, 2012, he was called up for the first time by the Diamondbacks.

Colorado Rockies
Wheeler was traded to the Colorado Rockies on November 20, 2012 in exchange for Matt Reynolds. He was designated for assignment by the Rockies on July 31, 2014.

Los Angeles Angels of Anaheim
Wheeler was claimed off waivers by the Los Angeles Angels of Anaheim on August 2, 2014. The Angels designated him for assignment on September 8. He was released on May 9, 2015.

Minnesota Twins
Wheeler signed a minor league deal with the Minnesota Twins on May 15, 2015. He was released on July 1, 2015.

Personal life
His brother, Jason Wheeler, currently is a free agent. In January 2016, he married Kelsey Moore, Miss Texas USA 2010 and a former volleyball player at UTEP.

References

External links

1988 births
Living people
Arizona Diamondbacks players
Baseball players from Torrance, California
Brewster Whitecaps players
Colorado Rockies players
Colorado Springs Sky Sox players
Loyola Marymount Lions baseball players
Major League Baseball third basemen
Mobile BayBears players
Reno Aces players
Salt Lake Bees players
Salt River Rafters players
South Bend Silver Hawks players
Visalia Rawhide players
Yakima Bears players